François Beaulne (born November 28, 1946) is a Quebec politician, he is the son of diplomats Yvon Beaulne and Thérèse Pratte.

Biography
Beaulne earned two master's degree from the University of Ottawa, in political science and in business administration, finance and commerce. He also has a doctorate in international relations from Columbia University.

He taught economics at the University of Ottawa. He then worked at the Consul of Canada in San Francisco from 1974 to 1978 and at the Department of External Affairs of Canada from 1978 to 1980. He became vice-president, international affairs, at the National Bank of Canada from 1980 to 1986. He returned to teaching at the Université du Québec à Montréal from 1987 until 1989.

Political career

While teaching, he ran for the NDP in the riding of Laurier-Sainte-Marie in the 1988 federal election, finishing in a strong third place. He caught the attention of Jacques Parizeau, the leader of the Parti Québécois and served as his Senior Economic Advisor.

Beaulne ran in the riding of Bertrand in 1989 and won.  He was re-elected in Marguerite-D'Youville in 1994 and served as Parliamentary Assistant to Premier Jacques Parizeau.

Beaulne was re-elected in 1998, he went on to serve as Parliamentary Assistant to the Minister of Citizenship and Immigration in the Lucien Bouchard government. He was Parliamentary Secretary to the Minister of State for International Relations in the Bernard Landry government until becoming the Second Vice President of the National Assembly of Quebec. Beaulne ran for re-election in 2003 but lost narrowly to Pierre Moreau as the Landry Government was turfed from office.

Diplomatic career

After losing his seat, Beaulne went to work at the United Nations and was a political adviser in five countries: Cambodia, Mozambique, Burundi, Côte d'Ivoire and Tunisia. He received the Cambodia Medal of Merit for his contribution to parliamentary democracy.

Attempted political comeback
In 2015, Beaulne sought the NDP nomination for the new riding of Pierre-Boucher—Les Patriotes—Verchères, he lost to Raphaël Fortin.

Electoral record

Federal

Provincial

References 

1946 births
Living people
Canadian diplomats
Canadian economists
French Quebecers
New Democratic Party candidates for the Canadian House of Commons
Parti Québécois MNAs
Politicians from Ottawa
School of International and Public Affairs, Columbia University alumni
Canadian officials of the United Nations
Academic staff of the Université du Québec à Montréal
University of Ottawa alumni
Academic staff of the University of Ottawa
Vice Presidents of the National Assembly of Quebec
20th-century Canadian legislators
21st-century Canadian legislators